The 1912–13 Connecticut Aggies men's basketball team represented Connecticut Agricultural College, now the University of Connecticut, in the 1912–13 collegiate men's basketball season. The Aggies completed the season with a 0–3 overall record. The Aggies were members of the Athletic League of New England State Colleges.

Schedule 

|-
!colspan=12 style=""| Regular Season

Schedule Source:

References 

UConn Huskies men's basketball seasons
Connecticut
1912 in sports in Connecticut
1913 in sports in Connecticut